Kendale Lakes is a census-designated place (CDP) and a suburb of Miami in Miami-Dade County, Florida, United States. The population was 55,646 at the 2020 census.

History
Kendale Lakes (and all of West Kendall) once had a large Miami Jewish population; many prominent attorneys lived there throughout the mid and late 70s. It was truly a bedroom community up until the mid to late 80s.  The portion east of 142 Av and between Sunset Dr and N Kendall Dr was built by Janis homes c. 1970; the portion west of 142 Av. was built by Caravel homes around 1973-74.

El Dorado Blvd was once a walk-through outdoor mall with many mom and pop stores called the Kendale Lakes Mall. It was a destination for locals and had many specialty shops like Second Skin, Smatt Bootery, Sentry Drugs, Mightiest Mortals and restaurants like Fiesta Tacos, The Carvery, Cozzoli's Pizza, Tiger Tea House and Burns Bakery to name but a few. It has always been a megaplex (450,000 square feet with one anchor mall and two strip malls and a roller skating rink on its eastern/northern periphery) and was the only built upon area west of 137 Av.

The southeast corner of 137 Av. was where Don Carter's Bowling Alley was located, now called Carter Plaza. Mike's Pizza and Marino's Pizza are two long time local favorites which remain open for business in Kendale Lakes. K-Mart is the only store which remains open from the original Kendale Lakes Mall which was one of the former mall's anchor stores. The other anchor store was Luria's. Kendale Lakes Mall remains a source of nostalgia for many locals who grew up in the area during the late 1970s and 1980s.

The Kendale Lakes Country Club was bought by the Miccosukee tribe. It originally was an amenity offered to local homeowners. It is still surrounded by tree lined streets - a canopy of trees and lush green lawns. Coral rocks cover a moat which is located around its circumference and it is dotted with lakes. At one time there was a small sandy beach and picnic area and pier which is now closed. There are remnants of the old pier. There were two pools at the country club (one for family and one for adults only) including an Olympic size pool, replaced now by a volleyball court.

Geography
It is bordered to the north by Tamiami, to the northeast by Westwood Lakes, to the southeast by Kendall, to the south by The Crossings, to the southwest by The Hammocks, and to the west by Kendall West.

The Homestead Extension of Florida's Turnpike forms the eastern edge of Kendale Lakes, with access from Exits 20 and 23. The highway leads north and east  to Florida's Turnpike between Miramar and Miami Gardens, and south  to its end at U.S. Route 1 in Florida City.

Demographics

2020 census

As of the 2020 United States census, there were 55,646 people, 17,698 households, and 14,143 families residing in the CDP.

2010 census

As of 2010, there were 19,185 households, with 4.7% being vacant. As of 2000, 42.1% had children under the age of 18 living with them, 60.6% were married couples living together, 17.3% had a female householder with no husband present, and 17.1% were non-families. 13.3% of all households were made up of individuals, and 4.8% had someone living alone who was 65 years of age or older.  The average household size was 3.13 and the average family size was 3.40.

2000 census
In 2000, the CDP the population was spread out, with 25.6% under the age of 18, 9.2% from 18 to 24, 31.0% from 25 to 44, 23.0% from 45 to 64, and 11.3% who were 65 years of age or older.  The median age was 36 years. For every 100 females, there were 89.6 males.  For every 100 females age 18 and over, there were 84.2 males.

In 2000, the median income for a household in the CDP was $44,156, and the median income for a family was $46,001. Males had a median income of $30,754 versus $26,134 for females. The per capita income for the CDP was $17,592.  About 8.7% of families and 10.3% of the population were below the poverty line, including 12.8% of those under age 18 and 10.5% of those age 65 or over.

As of 2000, speakers of Spanish  as a first language accounted for 82.44% of residents, while English made up 15.15% and French Creole was 0.84% of the population.

Education

Public schools
Miami-Dade County Public Schools operates public schools.

Elementary schools:
 Bent Tree Elementary School
 Kendale Lakes Elementary School - Kendale Lakes Elementary is located on SW 80th Street and SW 142nd Avenue in the Kendale Lakes Park, just south of the Kendale Lakes Golf Course. The students are known as the Kendale Lakes Tigers, although previously, they were the Sailboats.
 Royal Green Elementary School
K-8 schools:
 Ethel Koger Beckham K-8 Center
 Winston Park K-8 Center

Secondary schools:
 Howard D. McMillan Middle School
 Miami Sunset High School

Charter and private schools
Charter schools:
 Archimedean Schools (K-12), including Archimedean Upper Conservatory
 Somerset Palms Academy (K-8)
 Academir Preparatory Academy (elementary)

Private schools:
 Calusa Preparatory School (K-12)
 The Roman Catholic Archdiocese of Miami operates Catholic schools. Good Shepherd School (K-8) is in Kendale Lakes.

Holy Cross Academy was formerly in Kendale Lakes CDP. It closed in 2004.

References

Census-designated places in Miami-Dade County, Florida
Census-designated places in Florida